Rakvere Airfield is an airfield in Rakvere, Lääne-Viru County, Estonia.

The airfield was built in 1920s. During WW II the airfield was used by Luftwaffe. During Soviet Estonia the airfield was used by Soviet Air Force. In the beginning of 1990s, the airfield was abandoned. In the initiative of private pilots, the airfield is reopened since 2004.

References

External links
 Rakvere Airfield at Forgotten Airfields

Airports in Estonia
Buildings and structures in Lääne-Viru County
Soviet Air Force bases
Rakvere